The Tiger is the student newspaper at Clemson University in Clemson, South Carolina. It is the oldest college newspaper in the state of South Carolina and publishes a print edition once a month during both the fall and spring semesters, with occasional summer editions. It publishes online throughout the week during the fall and spring semesters, with over 30 members on its senior staff.

In August 2014, The Tiger started publishing twice weekly, on Tuesday and Thursday. One year later, in August 2015, the paper began publishing on Monday and Thursday. By 2017, it was publishing once a week on Monday. Today, The Tiger publishes print editions every two weeks and online content weekly during the school year.

References

External links
 Website

Student newspapers published in South Carolina
Publications established in 1907
Clemson University